The  were the only class of purpose-built cable layers of the Imperial Japanese Navy (IJN), serving during World War II. Four vessels were built in 1939–41 under the Maru 4 Programme.

Apart from laying communications cables, these ships were also designed as mine planters, for the installation of controlled mines in coastal fortifications.

Ships in class
Project number J21.

Photos

Footnotes

Bibliography
Monthly Ships of the World, Special issue Vol.45, "Escort Vessels of the Imperial Japanese Navy", (Japan), February 1996
The Maru Special, Japanese Naval Vessels No.47, "Japanese naval mine warfare crafts",  (Japan), January 1981
Senshi Sōsho Vol.31, Naval armaments and war preparation (1), "Until November 1941", Asagumo Simbun (Japan), November 1969

World War II naval ships of Japan
Auxiliary ships of the Imperial Japanese Navy
Cable laying ships
Coastal fortifications
 
Mine warfare vessels of the Imperial Japanese Navy
Nippon Telegraph and Telephone